Littleton Powys (23 January 1771 – 22 January 1842) was an English first-class cricketer who was active in the 1800s playing for Surrey. He is recorded in one first-class match in 1801, totalling 13 runs with a highest score of 10.

Powys was born in Lilford Park, Northamptonshire, and died at Thrapston, Northamptonshire, aged 71.

References

Bibliography
 

English cricketers
English cricketers of 1787 to 1825
Surrey cricketers
1771 births
1842 deaths
Marylebone Cricket Club cricketers